The Early Years is a 2004 compilation album by the British hard rock band Deep Purple. This is a compilation of material released in 1968 and 1969 and includes unreleased mixes and new mixes of tracks from the same period.

Track listing
 "And the Address" (remix) (Ritchie Blackmore, Jon Lord) – 4:33
 "Hush" (monitor mix) (Joe South) – 4:11
 "Mandrake Root" (Blackmore, Rod Evans, Lord) – 6:09
 "I'm So Glad" (remix) (Skip James) – 6:19
 "Hey Joe" (remix) (Billy Roberts) – 7:13
 "Kentucky Woman" (alternate take) (Neil Diamond) – 5:30
 "Listen, Learn, Read On" (Blackmore, Evans, Lord, Ian Paice) – 4:01
 "Shield" (Blackmore, Evans, Lord) – 6:03
 "Wring That Neck" (BBC session) (Blackmore, Lord, Nick Simper, Paice) – 4:40
 "Anthem" (Evans, Lord) – 6:28
 "The Bird Has Flown" (Evans, Blackmore, Lord) – 5:32
 "Blind" (remix) (Lord) – 5:28
 "Why Didn't Rosemary?" (Blackmore, Lord, Evans, Simper, Paice) – 5:01
 "Lalena" (instrumental version) (Donovan) – 5:09

Personnel

Deep Purple
 Rod Evans – lead vocals
 Ritchie Blackmore – guitar
 Jon Lord – organ, keyboards, backing vocals
 Nick Simper – bass, backing vocals
 Ian Paice – drums

Additional personnel
 Produced by Derek Lawrence
 Engineered by Barry Ainsworth
 Digitally remastered and remixed by Peter Mew at Abbey Road Studios, London

References

2004 compilation albums
Albums produced by Derek Lawrence
Deep Purple compilation albums
EMI Records compilation albums